Paul Dupré (29 June 1888 – 31 May 1916) was a French rugby player, who represented Racing Club de France and was selected for  for one match.

He was born in Gagny. In the First World War he was a private in the 4ème Zouaves regiment of the French Army, and died from wounds in the German prisoner-of-war camp at Altengrabow.

Early life
Paul Dupré was born on 29 June 1888 in Gagny, France.

Rugby career

The French were beaten 5–47, having lost the first encounter between the two countries, the previous year in Cardiff 36–4.

International appearances

Military service
In the First World War, Dupré was a soldat deuxième classe with the 4ème Zouaves light infantry regiment of the French Army. He was captured by the Germans, and died of his wounds in a prisoner-of-war camp in Altengrabow, Germany, on 31 May 1916. He is commemorated on the Monument au Morts 1914–1918 in his birthplace, Gagny, France.

See also
 List of international rugby union players killed in action during the First World War

Notes

References

External links
 

1888 births
1916 deaths
French rugby union players
French military personnel killed in World War I
Place of birth missing
Rugby union forwards
France international rugby union players